Nataliya Mikhaylovna Shymchuk (born November 14, 1980 in Plovdiv, Bulgaria) is a female javelin thrower from Belarus. Her personal best throw is 63.24 metres, achieved in June 2008 in Annecy. She is affiliated with the Republican Centre for Physical Education and Sports in Brest, Belarus.

Achievements

References

External links
 
 sports-reference

1980 births
Living people
Belarusian female javelin throwers
Athletes (track and field) at the 2004 Summer Olympics
Athletes (track and field) at the 2008 Summer Olympics
Olympic athletes of Belarus
Sportspeople from Plovdiv
Competitors at the 2003 Summer Universiade
Competitors at the 2005 Summer Universiade
Competitors at the 2007 Summer Universiade